Norrby IF is a Swedish professional football club based in Borås. Founded on 27 April 1927, the club is currently competing in the Superettan.

Background
The club's best achievement was being promoted to Allsvenskan (top level of Swedish football), after winning the second division in 1955. In Allsvenskan the team only managed to win three games, and were relegated after just one season, and have never returned to top-level football.

Norrby IF's average attendance in the top division, established through the course of the sole 1956 season, is 9,971.

The club is affiliated to the Västergötlands Fotbollförbund.

Season to season

Players

Current squad

Out on loan

Management

Technical staff

Attendances

In recent seasons Norrby IF have had the following average attendances:

Achievements

League
 Division 1 Södra:
 Runners-up (1): 2016

Footnotes

External links
  

Norrby IF
Football clubs in Västra Götaland County
Allsvenskan clubs
Sport in Borås
Association football clubs established in 1927
1927 establishments in Sweden